Huaguo may refer to:
 State of Hua (Hephthalite), name of the Hephthalites in Chinese chronicles
 Hua (state) (? – 627 BC), a state in China destroyed by the state of Qin
 Mount Huaguo, fictional mountain where the Monkey King resides